Brunswick West is an inner-city suburb in Melbourne, Victoria, Australia,  north of Melbourne's Central Business district, located within the City of Merri-bek local government area. Brunswick West recorded a population of 14,746 at the 2021 census.

Brunswick West adjoins Parkville to the south, Moonee Ponds at the Moonee Ponds Creek to the west, Pascoe Vale South and Coburg along Moreland Road to the north, and Brunswick along Grantham, Pearson and Shamrock Streets to the east. Parts of the suburb also borders the Tullamarine Freeway.

Brunswick West is primarily a residential suburb with some light industry.

History

Brunswick West Post Office opened on 10 March 1913. There is a Moonee Vale Licensed Post Office at 164 Melville Road Brunswick West.

Demographics

In Brunswick West, 59.7% of people were born in Australia. The most common countries of birth were Italy 4.3%, India 3.2%, Greece 3.0%, England 2.2% and China (excludes SARs and Taiwan) 1.9%.

59.9% of people only spoke English at home. Other languages spoken at home included Italian 6.9%, Greek 6.2%, Arabic 3.0%, Mandarin 2.2% and Spanish 1.1%.

Commerce

Grantham Street and Melville Road are the two main commercial activity centres in Brunswick West, comprising small-scale traditional shopping strips, with a small shopping centre (Union Square) on Grantham Street.

Transport

Bus
There are several bus routes on the main east–west streets:
 : Essendon station – East Brunswick via Brunswick West, Brunswick, Anstey RS (Monday to Saturday). Operated by Moonee Valley Coaches. Located along Albion Street.
 : Moonee Ponds Junction – Clifton Hill station via Brunswick West, Brunswick, Carlton North, Fitzroy North (Monday to Saturday). Operated by Dysons. Located along Brunswick Road.
 : Moonee Ponds Junction – Westgarth station via Brunswick West, Brunswick, Fitzroy North, Northcote (Monday to Saturday). Operated by Moonee Valley Coaches. Located along Dawson, Pearson, Smith and Allard Streets.
 : Alphington station – Moonee Ponds Junction via Brunswick West, Brunswick RS, Northcote, Fairfield (every day). Operated by Dysons. Located along Victoria Street.
 : Hope Street – Barkly Square Shopping Centre via Sydney Road, Melville Road, Brunswick RS (Monday to Saturday). Operated by Dysons.
 : Essendon station – Ivanhoe station via Brunswick, Northcote and Thornbury. Operated by Moreland Buslines. Located along Moreland Road.
  : Brunswick RS – Glenroy RS via West Coburg (operates Saturday and Sunday mornings only). Operated by Ventura Bus Lines.

Cycling
For cyclists, many streets have cycle lanes and the suburb also adjoins the Moonee Ponds Creek Trail to the west, and the Capital City Trail to the south.

Tram
Tram route  provides the main north–south link through the suburb and to the city, with a route that runs along Melville Road, Dawson Street and Grantham Street.

Educational facilities

Brunswick West has two government primary schools, Brunswick South-West Primary School and Brunswick North-West Primary School, and a Catholic school, St. Joseph's School.

Open space

The largest area of public open space is formed by the reservations along the Moonee Ponds Creek, which run adjacent to the Tullamarine Freeway. Dunstan Reserve, in the suburb's north, has two ovals, and there are several smaller reserves distributed evenly through the residential area.

The central section of Brunswick West also benefits from the adjacent Brunswick Central Parklands which run along the eastern boundary of Brunswick West between Hope Street and Dawson Street.

See also
 City of Brunswick – Brunswick West was previously within this former local government area.
 Brunswick Cricket Club – Home ground is in Brunswick West.

References

External links

Australian Places – Brunswick West

Suburbs of Melbourne
Suburbs of the City of Merri-bek